Agency is a science fiction novel by American-Canadian writer William Gibson, released on January 21, 2020.

It is a 'sequel and a prequel' to his previous novel The Peripheral (2014), reusing the technology from the novel to explore an alternative 2017 where Hillary Clinton won the 2016 Presidential Election. The story line further explores the concept of the "Jackpot", a back-story element of The Peripheral.

One plot is set in the alternative 2017, with a young woman named Verity testing a new form of avatar software developed by the military, for a start-up in San Francisco. A second plot line involves people in a post-apocalyptic 22nd century meddling with 2017.

CBC Books listed Agency on its list of Canadian fiction to watch for in spring 2020. It had originally been planned to be published in January 2018.

References 

Novels by William Gibson
American alternate history novels
Novels set in San Francisco
2020 American novels